The LFG V 39 was a simple biplane trainer built in Germany in the mid-1920s.  It took part in the Round Germany Flight in the summer of 1925.

Design and development
The V 39 was a two bay biplane with constant chord wings mounted with slight stagger and a wide gap.  The fabric covered wings had box spars and three-ply ribs. There were ailerons on both upper and lower wing, externally rod-connected. The upper wing was centrally supported with cabane struts.

The trainer was designed to be powered by a  Mercedes D.I or  D.II engine.  It is known that the smaller engine at least was flown. The fuselage was deep bellied, flat sided, constructed from wood and covered with three-ply. There were two open, tandem cockpits, the rear one provided with vision enhancing trailing edge cut-outs in both upper and lower planes. The V 39's undercarriage was standard for the time, with mainwheels on a rigid axle supported by fuselage mounted V-struts and with a tailskid.

The V 39 was designed to combine modest performance with reliability and robustness with easy handling and a low landing speed.

Operational history
The V 39 was one of more than ninety aircraft to take part in the Round Germany Flight held in the summer of 1925.

Specifications

References

Biplanes
1920s German civil trainer aircraft
LFG V 39)